The Bryant Bulldogs men's basketball statistical leaders are individual statistical leaders of the Bryant Bulldogs men's basketball program in various categories, including points, rebounds, assists, steals, and blocks. Within those areas, the lists identify single-game, single-season, and career leaders. As of the next NCAA basketball season in 2022–23, the Bulldogs represent Bryant University in the NCAA Division I America East Conference.

Bryant began competing in intercollegiate basketball in 1963. The NCAA has recorded scoring statistics throughout the "modern era" of basketball, which it defines as starting with the 1937–38 season, the first after the center jump after each made basket was abolished. Rebounding and assists were added in the 1950–51 season. While rebounding has been recorded in each subsequent season, the NCAA stopped recording assists after the 1951–52 season, and did not reinstate assists as an official statistic until 1983–84. Blocks and steals were added in 1985–86. Bryant's record book includes all seasons, whether or not the NCAA officially recorded those statistics in the relevant seasons. These lists are updated through the end of the 2020–21 season.

Scoring

Rebounds

Assists

Steals

Blocks

References

Lists of college basketball statistical leaders by team
Statistical